Ganpat Sahai was an Indian politician. He was elected to the Lok Sabha, the lower house of the Parliament of India from the Sultanpur, Uttar Pradesh as a member of the Indian National Congress.

References

External links
 Official biographical sketch in Parliament of India website

1882 births
India MPs 1957–1962
India MPs 1967–1970
Lok Sabha members from Uttar Pradesh
Indian National Congress politicians from Uttar Pradesh
Year of death missing